A  (from the French verb  meaning 'to repeat, to go over, to learn, to rehearse') is an accompanist, tutor or coach of ballet dancers or opera singers. A feminine form, also appears but is comparatively rare.

Opera 
When coaching solo singers or choir members, the  will take on a number of the roles of a vocal coach: advising singers on how to improve their pitch and pronunciation, and correcting note or phrasing errors.

 are skilled musicians who have strong sight-reading and score reading skills. In addition to being able to sight read piano parts, a  can play on the piano an orchestral score reducing it in real-time (orchestral reduction), by reading from a large open score of all of the instruments and voice parts.  are also skilled in following the directions of a conductor, in terms of changing the tempo, pausing, or adding other nuances.

Ballet 
In ballet, a  teaches the steps and interpretation of the roles to some or all of the company performing a dance.

References

External links

Occupations in music
Dance teachers
Ballet occupations